White Salmon  is a city in Klickitat County, Washington, United States. It is located in the Columbia River Gorge. The population was 2,193 at the 2000 census and increased 1.4% to 2,224 at the 2010 census.

History
White Salmon was first settled in 1852 by Erastus Joslyn and his wife.  White Salmon was officially incorporated on June 3, 1907.

White Salmon was part of the home of the Klickitat Tribe, now a part of the Yakama Confederated Nations.  The Klickitat Tribe sold some land to the Joslyns. They were generally Native advocates for the time. The area was thrown open on October 31, 1858 for white settlement after the Klickitat and Yakama lost the fight for their homelands in the Yakama War.  Within the same year, the region was very rapidly and heavily settled by white immigrants making land claims. The Klickitat were forced to relocate to the Yakama Reservation.

White Salmon was named after the White Salmon, a now-extinct species of salmon that lived in the Columbia River and surrounding area.

Government
White Salmon's current city government includes Mayor Marla Keethler, who was elected to a four-year term in November 2019.

New council members elected in November 2019 to four-year terms include Ashley Post (Position 1), David Lindley (Position 2), Jason Hartmann (Position 3)  and Jim Ransier (Position 4) and Joe Turkiewicz (Position 5).

Geography
White Salmon is located at  (45.728792, -121.483557).

The city is located opposite Hood River, Oregon on the Columbia River.

Climate

Demographics

2010 census
At the 2010 census there were 2,224 people in 921 households, including 559 families, in the city. The racial makeup of the city was 78.8% White, 0.3% African American, 1.4% Native American, 0.9% Asian, 14.7% from other races, and 3.9% from two or more races. Hispanic or Latino of any race were 24.4%.

Of the 921 households 31.5% had children under the age of 18 living with them, 45.7% were married couples living together, 10.7% had a female householder with no husband present, 4.2% had a male householder with no wife present, and 39.3% were non-families. 33.1% of households were one person and 14.3% were one person aged 65 or older. The average household size was 2.41 and the average family size was 3.09.

The median age was 38.1 years. 25.6% of residents were under the age of 18; 6.5% were between the ages of 18 and 24; 26.8% were from 25 to 44; 25.2% were from 45 to 64; and 15.8% were 65 or older. The gender makeup of the city was 48.6% male and 51.4% female.

2000 census
At the 2000 census there were 2,193 people in 887 households, including 590 families, in the city. The population density was 1,759.2 people per square mile (677.4/km). There were 948 housing units at an average density of 760.5 per square mile (292.8/km).  The racial makeup of the city was 83.08% White, 0.23% African American, 1.14% Native American, 0.73% Asian, 0.09% Pacific Islander, 12.04% from other races, and 2.69% from two or more races. Hispanic or Latino of any race were 16.83%.

Of the 887 households 34.4% had children under the age of 18 living with them, 50.1% were married couples living together, 12.3% had a female householder with no husband present, and 33.4% were non-families. 29.7% of households were one person and 14.2% were one person aged 65 or older. The average household size was 2.46 and the average family size was 3.03.

The age distribution was 28.7% under the age of 18, 7.0% from 18 to 24, 28.2% from 25 to 44, 20.4% from 45 to 64, and 15.7% 65 or older. The median age was 37 years. For every 100 females, there were 93.0 males. For every 100 females age 18 and over, there were 84.7 males.

The median household income was $34,787 and the median family income  was $39,653. Males had a median income of $33,021 versus $20,417 for females. The per capita income for the city was $17,995. About 13.0% of families and 16.7% of the population were below the poverty line, including 23.6% of those under age 18 and 12.8% of those age 65 or over.

References

External links
 City website
 The Enterprise, local newspaper

Cities in Washington (state)
Cities in Klickitat County, Washington
Columbia River Gorge
Washington (state) populated places on the Columbia River